is a Japanese football player for Blaublitz Akita.

Club statistics
Updated to 7 December 2022.

References

External links

Profile at Azul Claro Numazu

1990 births
Living people
Toin University of Yokohama alumni
People from Atsugi, Kanagawa
Association football people from Kanagawa Prefecture
Japanese footballers
J2 League players
J3 League players
Japan Football League players
Yokohama FC players
AC Nagano Parceiro players
FC Ryukyu players
Azul Claro Numazu players
Thespakusatsu Gunma players
Blaublitz Akita players
Association football forwards